The 2006 Cork Premier Intermediate Football Championship was the inaugural staging of the Cork Premier Intermediate Football Championship since its establishment by the Cork County Board. The draw for the opening round fixtures took place on 11 December 2005. The championship began on 8 April 2006 and ended on 26 November 2006.

The final was contested between St. Vincent's and Glanmire at Páirc Uí Rinn in Cork. After two replays, St. Vincent's won the title by 1-05 to 0-07 to claim their first championship title in the grade and a first title in any grade since 1968.

Glanmire's James Murphy was the championship's top scorer with 0-39.

Results

Round 1

Round 2

Round 3

Quarter-finals

Semi-finals

Finals

Championship statistics

Top scorers

Overall

In a single game

Miscellaneous

 On 10 June 2006, the Nemo Rangers-Glenville second-round tie was abandoned after 58 minutes after a Glenville selector became ill. The match was replayed several days later.
 St. Vincent's become the first Premier Intermediate Football Champions.

References

Cork Premier Intermediate Football Championship